Ryan McDonough (born January 2, 1988) is a Canadian professional ice hockey forward currently playing for the HC Valpellice of the Elite.A.

McDonough played junior hockey in the Ontario Hockey League, spending one season with the Sudbury Wolves and three seasons with the Saginaw Spirit.  He led the Spirit in points in 2005-06 with 88 points and in 2007-08 he led the team in goals with 45.  Despite this, McDonough remained undrafted in the 2008 NHL Entry Draft.  He turned pro in 2008 and signed with EC Red Bull Salzburg in the Austrian Hockey League.

After a season with Salzburg, McDonough returned briefly to North America to attend and play hockey with the University of Western Ontario before leaving to play for EV Landshut in the second German league.

After one season in the Italian league Elite.A with HC Valpellice and two seasons with the Hannover Indians back in the 2nd Bundesliga in Germany, on August 27, 2013, McDonough returned to North America yet again, signing a one-year two-way contract with the Worcester Sharks of the AHL, though before playing a game with the Sharks, he was assigned to their ECHL affiliate, the San Francisco Bulls before being released on December 10, 2014.

On January 8, 2014, after being released by the Sharks, McDonough returned to Valpellice in Italy.

April 16, 2014 McDonough signed with Odense Bulldogs being their topscorer for the 2014-16 season. McDonough resigned with the Bulldogs for season 2015-16.

Ryan Mcdonough decided to return to German hockey by signing with SC Riessersee for 2016-17.

Career statistics

Regular season and playoffs

International

References

External links

1988 births
Canadian ice hockey centres
EC Red Bull Salzburg players
EV Landshut players
HC Valpellice players
Living people
Saginaw Spirit players
Sportspeople from Etobicoke
Ice hockey people from Toronto
Sudbury Wolves players
Canadian expatriate ice hockey players in Austria
Canadian expatriate ice hockey players in Italy
Canadian expatriate ice hockey players in Germany